The Volkswagen Type 181 is a two-wheel drive, four-door, convertible, manufactured and marketed by Volkswagen from 1968 until 1983. Originally developed for the West German Army, the Type 181 also entered the civilian market as the Kurierwagen (“courier car”) in West Germany, the Trekker (RHD Type 182) in the United Kingdom, the Thing in the United States (1973–74), the Safari in Mexico and South America, and Pescaccia in Italy.  Civilian sales ended after model year 1980.

Manufactured in Wolfsburg, West Germany (1968–74), Hannover, West Germany (1974–75), Emden, West Germany (1975–78), Puebla, Mexico (1970–80), and Jakarta, Indonesia (1972–80), the Type 181 shared its mechanicals with Volkswagen's Type 1 (Beetle) and the pre-1968 Volkswagen Microbus, its floor pan with the Type 1 Karmann Ghia, and its concept with the company's Kübelwagen, which had been used by the German military during World War II.

All four doors were removable and interchangeable, the windshield folded flat, and the convertible roof could be removed for al fresco driving. The spartan interior featured vinyl covered bucket seats, painted sheet metal, drain holes and perforated rubber mats. A
fiberglass hardtop and trunk-mounted auxiliary heater were offered as individual options.

History

During the 1960s, several European governments began cooperating on development of a vehicle known as the Europa Jeep, a lightweight, amphibious four-wheel drive vehicle that could be mass-produced for use by various national military and government groups. 
Development of the vehicle proved time-consuming, however, and the West German government was in need of a limited number of light, inexpensive, durable transport vehicles that could fulfill their basic needs while the Europa Jeep was being developed and put into production.

Although Volkswagen had been approached during the 1950s about building such a vehicle, and had subsequently passed on the proposition, the then-current management of the company saw the project as having some amount of potential as a consumer vehicle; Mexican customers were asking for something that could handle rural roads better than the Type 1, which was a large seller in Mexico at the time, and the popularity of VW-based dune buggies within the U.S. made executives think that a durable, fun, off-road-capable vehicle would become attractive to many buyers. 
VW could keep cost to a minimum and thus maximize profitability by using existing parts. 

Like the World War II era Type 82 Kübelwagen, the Type 181 used mechanical parts and a rear-engine platform, manual transmission and a flat-4 engine derived from that of the Type 1. 

The floorpans came from the Type 1 Karmann Ghia, which had a wider floorpan than the Beetle. 
Rear swing axle suspension with reduction gearing from the discontinued split-screen Volkswagen Transporter was used until 1973, when it was replaced with double-jointed axles used by Porsche and IRS semi-trailing arm setup as used on the 1303 and US-spec Beetles.

Civilian sales began in mainland Europe and Mexico during 1971; in the U.S. in 1972; and briefly in Britain in 1975, where it failed to sell well and was dropped fairly quickly.

The model was dropped from the American lineup for 1975 as it failed to meet new, stricter US safety standards. The Type 181 was reclassified as a passenger vehicle, and thus subject to stricter safety standards. The Windshield Intrusion Rule of the 1975 DOT standard called for a greater distance between the front seat occupants and the front window glass.

The Europa Jeep was the result of a NATO plan to have a vehicle whereby each European NATO makers all combined to build a light-duty patrol vehicle. 

The Volkswagen 181 was only supposed to a fill in until the time that the Europa Jeep was ready. From 1968 until 1979, over 50,000 Type 181s were delivered to the NATO forces. 
By 1979 the Europa Jeep project had fallen apart completely and was abandoned, and the West German government began supplementing its consumption of 181s with the new front-engined Type 183 Iltis.

Despite the West German government's switch to the Type 183, European and Mexican sales of the civilian 181 continued through 1980, and several organizations, including NATO, continued to purchase military-spec Type 181 units through 1983, finding their reliability and low purchase and maintenance costs attractive.

Technology and performance

Military 181s attain a higher ride height and lower effective gearing by using reduction boxes, a form of portal axles.  181s without reduction boxes feature a transmission similar to the Beetle but with a slower gearing by use of different ring and pinion gears and have stronger, more flexible CV axles. Most mechanical parts are interchangeable with those of other VW models. Optional dual oil bath air cleaners increased filtering ability in dusty environments, and low noise ignition systems were fitted to military cars to be used for radio communication.

The engine is a 4-cylinder rear mounted petrol engine.

See also
Citroën Méhari
BMC Mini Moke
Volkswagen Iltis
Fiat Ghia Jolly

References

Further reading
Schreier, Konrad F. Jr., ed. VW Kubelwagen Military Portfolio 1940–1990.

External links

Type 181 toys from 1972 until 2009
 181 facts and figures
VW Thing Sales Brochures Retrieved from www.dastank.com on 23 June 2009

181
Rear-engined vehicles
Cars powered by boxer engines
Cold War military vehicles of Germany
Military vehicles introduced in the 1960s